Bernina International AG is a privately owned international manufacturer of sewing and embroidery systems. The company was founded in Steckborn, Switzerland, by a Swiss inventor Fritz Gegauf. The company develops, manufactures, and sells goods and services for the textile market, primarily household sewing-related products in the fields of embroidery, quilting, home textiles, garment sewing, and crafting. The origins of the company lie in the invention of the hemstitch sewing machine, invented in 1893 by a Swiss inventor and entrepreneur Karl Friedrich Gegauf. Currently, the company's products include sewing machines, embroidery machines, serger/overlocker machines, and computer software for embroidery design.

History

1890–1926: Karl Friedrich Gegauf and the invention of the hemstitch sewing machine 

The present-day Bernina International AG was founded by Karl Friedrich Gegauf in 1893, when he decided to pursue an apprenticeship as a mechanic instead of studying medicine. After completing his apprenticeship, he worked in the Baum embroidery machine factory in Rorschach. In 1890, Karl Friedrich Gegauf set up his own business in Steckborn, Switzerland, opening an embroidery and mechanical workshop for the manufacture of his own invention, a monogram embroidery machine. Together with his brother Georg, a salesman, Karl Friedrich ran the Gebrüder Gegauf (Bros. Gegauf) company. Through his involvement in the textile industry, he noticed how laborious it was to produce hemstitching, which until then could only be done manually. Consequently, in 1893, Karl Friedrich Gegauf invented the world's first hemstitch sewing machine, capable of sewing 100 stitches per minute. In 1895, the Bros. Gegauf workshop was completely destroyed by fire, except for the prototype of the hemstitch sewing machine, which was the only thing that could be rescued. Karl Friedrich built a new workshop in an old barn, where the focus was no longer on embroidery, but on the construction of the hemstitch sewing machine. About 70 people were employed in the serial production of the hemstitch sewing machine. The mechanical production of hemstitching, whether as embellishment for handkerchiefs, tablecloths, or bedspreads, was commonly referred to as "gegaufing", because the name Gegauf became famous in the industry.

1926–1947: Fritz Gegauf and the development of the first Bernina household sewing machine 

In 1919, Fritz Gegauf, one of Karl's sons, together with his father, filed a patent application for the "Wotan" hemstitch sewing machine, which became another international success for the company, which changed its name to "Fritz Gegauf". After being in Paris selling the company's tin openers, which had no market in Switzerland, he returned to his home town. His brother Gustav and he took control of the factory after their father's death in 1926. During the Great Depression, Fritz Gegauf joined forces with the embroidery factory, Brütsch & Sohn in St. Gallen, which was also operating in the red. By the end of 1932, they had developed the company's first household sewing machine, which they named Bernina. The Bernina was soon being produced as furniture-cum-sewing-machine, which required the building of a new, attached furniture factory in Steckborn. As of October 26, 1937, a total of 20,000 machines had left the factory in Steckborn. In 1937, he introduced the first Bernina zigzag machine and in 1945 the world's first portable zigzag machine on the market. In 1947, Gustav Gegauf left the company. By mid-1963, one million Bernina zigzag sewing machines had been manufactured in Steckborn. Since then, the company has commonly been called Bernina, although, since 1947, its official name has been "Fritz Gegauf Aktiengesellschaft, Bernina Nähmaschinenfabrik".

1959–1988: Odette Gegauf-Ueltschi and the fully automatic sewing machine 

Since 1959, Odette Ueltschi, Fritz Gegauf's daughter, took the lead role at Bernina. She took over the management after the death of her brother in 1965. In 1963, the first Bernina sewing machine with a patented knee-activated presser foot lifter, the 730, appeared on the market. From 1963 onwards, the subsequent model, the 730, was produced, and in the same year, the millionth Bernina sewing machine was manufactured. The top-seller of all the models was the 830 class, which came into production in 1971 and continued until 1981. In 1981, the company took a further step in the development of household sewing machines. The 930 model was the first machine with a stretch-stitch function. It was followed by the 1130, the first fully automated sewing machine, launched in 1986. The enduring mark which Odette Gegauf-Ueltschi left on the company is reflected in the name of the bernette sewing machine line, formed by a combination of the first half of the brand name and the second half of her given name.

1988–2009: Hanspeter Ueltschi and the first sewing computer, expansion of markets and production 

Hanspeter Ueltschi took over the management of Fritz Gegauf AG in 1988 from his mother Odette Gegauf-Ueltschi, and  currently runs the company as owner and chairman of the board of directors. After studying business administration at the University of St. Gallen, Ueltschi spent seven years gaining professional experience in the USA before getting into the leadership of the family company in Switzerland. Ueltschi further expanded the leading position of the company in the sewing machine technology sector, brought down manufacturing costs, and promoted product innovations and marketing. He ushered the computer age into the business with the artista 180, Bernina's first sewing computer, and ensured the continuous development and optimization of computer technology in the sewing sphere, as shown by the successive models of the artista, as well as the aurora series. In doing so, he made strides toward his declared goal of making sewing more appealing and more popular worldwide. Under the chairmanship of Hanspeter Ueltschi, a manufacturing outlet was set up in Thailand, in addition to the parent factory in Steckborn. He is also largely responsible for establishing the US as a key market and expansion to the new markets in Eastern Europe, Russia, South America, and India, as well as in the Middle East. He renamed "Fritz Gegauf AG" to "Bernina International AG"  to accommodate the trend toward globalization and the success of the company brand and at the same time, Ueltschi incorporated the flag of Switzerland into the company logo as a sign of patriotism. Linking to the 830, the most successful Bernina model from the 1970s, the new B830, in 2008 and its sister model, the B820, in 2009, were introduced as the most advanced sewing machines of the brand to date, with a total of 15 patents filed for the new B830.

Present

The Bernina Textile Group is a globally active group of 15 companies doing business in 80 countries. The company operates in the product categories such as household sewing and embroidery machines, household overlocker machines, longarm quilting machines, multineedle embroidery machines, accessories (presser foot, embroidery hoops and other accessories for sewing, quilting and overlocking), and computer software for embroidery design.

Subsidiaries are established in Australia, Austria, Belgium, Germany, Japan, the Netherlands, New Zealand, Switzerland, and the USA. The subsidiary Benartex, headquartered in the United States, sells printed textiles and quilting fabrics in particular. OESD, another subsidiary, develops and sells embroidery designs. Brewer, engaging in the sewing supplies market, offers sewing and crafting notions, patterns, books etc. The company supplies 80 markets worldwide via business-to-business connections.

The latest model, B 880, is the company's current flagship model, while the 7 series models are Bernina's most advanced products, equipped with the Bernina hook system for 9 mm stitch width at up to 1,000 stitches per minute.

Models

Timeline

Model ranges

Embroidery software 

Bernina developed embroidery design editing and full digitizing software branded under its own name and written by industrial digitizing software manufacturer Wilcom International Pty Ltd.

See also 
 List of sewing machine brands
 Sewing machine
 Machine embroidery

References

Further reading

 Daniela Dujmic-Erbe: Bernina - Der rote Faden in der Welt des Nähens, 2006, 
 Fredy Meyer: Der Erfinder Karl Friedrich Gegauf, 2010, Medien Konstanz GmbH, 
 Verein für wirtschaftshistorische Studien: Schweizer Pioniere der Wirtschaft und Technik, 1969, Zürich, Band 21

External links 

bernette, a brand of the BERNINA Textile Group.

Swiss brands
Sewing machine brands
Manufacturing companies established in 1893
Swiss companies established in 1893